Matteo Tassetti is a paralympic athlete from Italy competing mainly in category T12 sprint events.

Matteo has competed in the 100m and 200m in the 1996, 2000 and 2004 Summer Paralympics but it was in the 2000 games where he won a gold medal in the 4 × 100 m relay as part of the Italian gold medal relay team.

References

External links
 

Paralympic athletes of Italy
Athletes (track and field) at the 1996 Summer Paralympics
Athletes (track and field) at the 2000 Summer Paralympics
Athletes (track and field) at the 2004 Summer Paralympics
Paralympic gold medalists for Italy
Living people
Medalists at the 2000 Summer Paralympics
Year of birth missing (living people)
Paralympic medalists in athletics (track and field)
Italian male sprinters
Visually impaired sprinters
Paralympic sprinters